The 1910–11 season was Madrid Football Club's 9th season in existence.  The club played some friendly matches.  They also played in the Campeonato Regional de Madrid (Madrid Regional Championship).

Arthur Johnson was appointed as manager of Madrid FC in 1910 becoming the first manager in the club's history.

Summary

Friendlies

Copa Rodriguez Arzuaga

Competitions

Overview

Campeonato Regional de Madrid

Notes

References

External links
Realmadrid.com Official Site
1910–11 Squad
1910–11 (Campeonato de Madrid)

Real Madrid
Real Madrid CF seasons